Thirunagar is a residential area in the city of Erode. It is also known as Thirunagar Colony. It is 2 km from the central bus station, 5 km from Pallipalayam and 5 km from Erode Junction railway station.

It is located near Karungalpalayam in the northern part of the city.

Neighbourhoods in Erode